Yerison Rabekoto (born 16 April 1982) is a Malagasy retired basketball player. He played for SEBAM in Madagascar and Jeunesse Canon in France. Rabekoto was one of Madagascar's most prominent basketball figures. 

He recorded second most minutes and most steals for the Madagascar national basketball team at the 2011 FIBA Africa Championship in Antananarivo.

References

External links
FIBA Profile
Afrobasket.com Profile

1984 births
Living people
Malagasy men's basketball players
People from Antsiranana
Point guards